Andy Winter is a British comics writer. He is best known for creating Hero Killers, with Declan Shalvey, which won the Eagle Award for "Favourite British Black and White Comicbook".

He largely publishes his work through his own Moonface Press.

Bibliography
 Devilchild (Moonface Press):
 Hell Is Round the Corner (with Natalie Sandells, Tim Twelves, Peet Clack and Tim Doe, 86 pages, May 2002)
 Freakshow (with Natalie Sandells, Sean Azzopardi, Tim Twelves, Duncan Nimmo and Phill Evans, 82 pages, May 2004)
 Heaven's Prisoners (with Keith Burns, Jason Dennis and Duane Leslie, 92 pages, July 2005)
 Shriek! (with Natalie Sandells, Adrian Bamforth, Mikey Ball, Tim Twelves and Duane Leslie, Moonface Press, 2005)
 Hero Killers (with Declan Shalvey, one-shot, Moonface Press, 2006)
 Blood Psi (with Keith Burns, one-shot, Moonface Press, 2007)
 Septic Isle (with Mick Trimble, one-shot, Moonface Press, 2008)
 Brit Force (with Andy Radbourne, Moonface Press, 2008-ongoing)
 Brothers (with Andy Radbourne, 2008, forthcoming)

Awards
 2006: Won "Favourite British Black and White Comicbook" Eagle Award, for Hero Killers

Notes

References

External links 
 Winter's Wonderland, official blog
 Andy Winter at ComicSpace
 Hero Killers site
 Blood Psi
 Brit Force
 Moonface Press

Interviews
 Declan Shalvey & Andy Winter: Hero Creators, Comics Bulletin, December 12, 2006
 Andy Winter and Declan Shalvey: Writer and Artist of Hero Killer, Jazma Online, December 23, 2006
 Septic Isle: England's Ugly Underbelly, Comics Bulletin, September 4, 2008

Reviews
Septic Isle at Broken Frontier

Living people
Year of birth missing (living people)
British comics writers